The Leeds City Council elections were held on Thursday, 2 May 1991, with one third of the council and a vacancy in Horsforth to be elected.

The upsurge in Labour support recorded the previous year mostly unwound, allowing the Conservatives and the renamed Liberal Democrats a more successful election - although the latter also looked to be recovering from their disastrous merger, fielding a more convincing slate and gaining a moderate rise in their vote. The surprise Conservative losses of 1990 election were all defended this time round - although only narrowly in the case of Weetwood, with Halton and Pudsey North being much safer and Aireborough actually a gain from the Lib Dems. Labour managed a gain a seat apiece from the main opposition parties, with a comfortable win in Burmantofts from the Lib Dems and snatching the last Conservative seat in Morley North to further extend their record majority.

Meanwhile, the Greens stood in over a third of the wards - their strongest slate in over a decade, and the Liberals won third place in each of the handful of wards they stood in. Notably absent were the enduring CPGB and David Owen's Social Democrats, both parties having chosen to dissolve themselves by the time of election.

Election result

This result has the following consequences for the total number of seats on the council after the elections:

Ward results

References

1991 English local elections
1991
1990s in Leeds